Michael Dallas Jr. (born December 19, 1986) is an American professional boxer.

Amateur career
Michael had an impressive amateur record of 115-12. He won a gold medal at the PAL International Junior Olympics in 2000. In 2002 he won a bronze medal at the US National Silver Gloves championships, losing to three-time Olympian Rau'shee Warren. That same year he was a runner-up at the PAL Junior championships (15-16 age range) at 112 lbs. During the 2004 US Western Olympic trials, he lost to Diego Magdaleno. At the 2006 National Golden Gloves he won a silver medal, losing to Brad Solomon. Mike also got a gold medal at the 2006 PAL championships at 64 kg, beating Karl Dargan and Raul Tovar. He went to the US 2008 Olympic trials at 64 kg, where he beat Brad Solomon but lost to Daniel O'Connor and Danny Garcia.

Sparring Partners
Some of the boxers Michael has sparred with are 8-division world champion Manny Pacquiao and the undefeated Light Welterweight prospect Jose Benavidez.

Professional career
He made his professional debut in March 2008 in the Light Welterweight weight class against Alejandro Balladares and won all four rounds of the bout for a unanimous decision victory.

In July 2010, he made his debut on Showtime boxing against undefeated Lanard Lane. Despite predicting an easy knock-out, Lane found himself overwhelmed and all three judges scored the bout 78-74 in favor of Dallas.

Professional record

|- style="margin:0.5em auto; font-size:95%;"
|align="center" colspan=8|21 Wins (10 knockouts), 3 Losses, 2 Draw
|- style="margin:0.5em auto; font-size:95%;"
|align=center style="border-style: none none solid solid; background: #e3e3e3"|Res.
|align=center style="border-style: none none solid solid; background: #e3e3e3"|Record
|align=center style="border-style: none none solid solid; background: #e3e3e3"|Opponent
|align=center style="border-style: none none solid solid; background: #e3e3e3"|Type
|align=center style="border-style: none none solid solid; background: #e3e3e3"|Rd., Time
|align=center style="border-style: none none solid solid; background: #e3e3e3"|Date
|align=center style="border-style: none none solid solid; background: #e3e3e3"|Location
|align=center style="border-style: none none solid solid; background: #e3e3e3"|Notes
|- align=center
|style="background: #B0C4DE"|Draw
|21-3-2
|align=left| Dusty Hernández-Harrison
|
|
|
|align=left|
|align=left|
|-align=center
|Win || 21-3-1 ||align=left|Odilon Rivera
|KO || 2 (6) (2:52) || 2015-12-19||align=left|Billar El Perro Salado, Tijuana, Baja California, Mexico
|align=left|
|-align=center
|Win || 20-3-1 ||align=left|Alejandro Alonso
|KO || 2 (6) (0:12) || 2015-11-20 ||align=left|Billar El Perro Salado, Tijuana, Baja California, Mexico
|align=left|
|-align=center
|Loss || 19-3-1 ||align=left|Lucas Matthysse
|KO || 1 (12) (2:26) || 2013-01-26 ||align=left|Hard Rock Hotel and Casino, The Joint, Las Vegas, Nevada, USA
|align=left|For interim WBC Light Welterweight title
|-align=center
|Win || 19-2-1 ||align=left|Javier Castro
|KO || 6 (12) || 2012-06-22 ||align=left|Soboba Casino, San Jacinto, California, USA
|align=left|Won WBO Latino Light Welterweight title
|-align=center
|Win || 18-2-1 ||align=left|Miguel Gonzalez
|UD || 10 (10) || 2012-02-17 ||align=left|College Park Center, Arlington, Texas, USA
|align=left|
|-align=center
|Loss || 17-2-1 ||align=left|Mauricio Herrera
|MD || 10 (10) || 2011-06-24 ||align=left|Pechanga Resort & Casino, Temecula, California
|align=left|
|-align=center
|Loss || 17-1-1 ||align=left|Josésito López
|KO || 7 (1:47) || 2011-01-28 ||align=left|Pechanga Resort & Casino, Temecula, California
|align=left|For the vacant NABF Light Welterweight title
|-align=center
|Win || 17-0-1 ||align=left|Devarise Crayton
|KO || 2 (2:41) || 2010-10-30 ||align=left|The Palace, Auburn Hills, Michigan
|align=left|
|-align=center
|Win || 16-0-1 ||align=left|Lenin Arroyo
|TKO || 2 (1:30) || 2010-10-07 ||align=left|Tachi Palace Hotel & Casino, Lemoore, California
|align=left|
|-align=center
|Win  || 15-0-1 ||align=left|Lanard Lane
|UD || 8 (8) || 2010-07-16 ||align=left|DeSoto Civic Center, Southaven, Mississippi
|align=left|Lane was undefeated going in
|-align=center
|Win || 14-0-1 ||align=left|Daniel Gonzalez
|TKO || 2 (8) || 2010-05-08 ||align=left| Home Depot Center, Carson, California, USA
|align=left|
|-align=center
|Win || 13-0-1 ||align=left|Genaro Trazancos
|TKO || 1 (8) || 2010-04-08 ||align=left|Tachi Palace Hotel & Casino, Lemoore, California, USA
|align=left|
|-align=center
|Win || 12-0-1 ||align=left|Fabian Luque
|TKO || 1 (4) || 2010-03-05 ||align=left|Pechanga Resort & Casino, Temecula, California, USA
|align=left|
|-align=center
|Win || 11-0-1 ||align=left|  Sergio Joel De la Torre
|UD || 6 (6) || 2009-10-22 ||align=left|Tachi Palace Hotel & Casino, Lemoore, California, USA
|align=left|
|-align=center
|Win || 10-0-1 ||align=left|  Vincent Arroyo
|UD || 6 (6) || 2009-10-22 ||align=left|Pechanga Resort & Casino, Temecula, California, USA
|align=left|
|-align=center
|Win || 9-0-1 ||align=left|  Francisco Rios Gil
|KO || 1 (6) || 2009-07-16 ||align=left|Tachi Palace Hotel & Casino, Lemoore, California, USA
|align=left|
|-align=center
|Win || 8-0-1 ||align=left|  Marcus Brashears
|UD || 5 (5) || 2009-04-23 ||align=left|Tachi Palace Hotel & Casino, Lemoore, California, USA
|align=left|
|-align=center
|Win || 7-0-1 ||align=left|  Terrance Jett
|UD || 4 (4) || 2009-04-11 ||align=left|Mandalay Bay Hotel & Casino, Mandalay Bay Events Center, Las Vegas, Nevada, USA
|align=left|
|-align=center
|Win || 6-0-1 ||align=left|  Anthony Martinez
|UD || 4 (4) || 2009-02-06 ||align=left|Tachi Palace Hotel & Casino, Lemoore, California, USA
|align=left|
|-align=center
align=left
|-align=center
|style="background: #B0C4DE"|Draw
|5-0-1
|align=left| Luis Alfredo Lugo
|
|
|
|align=left|Citizens Business Bank Arena, Ontario, California, USA
|align=left|
|-align=center

Personal life
On June 12, 2008 Dallas, Jr. had a son named Mekai. He's a graduate of South High School in Bakersfield, where he played on both the basketball and football teams. His father Michael Dallas, Sr. fought professionally from 1991 to 1998.

References

External links

Light-welterweight boxers
Sportspeople from Bakersfield, California
1986 births
Living people
Boxers from California
American male boxers